The year 2005 is the fifth year in the history of Deep, a mixed martial arts promotion based in Japan. In 2005 Deep held 10 events beginning with, Deep: 18th Impact.

Title fights

Events list

Deep: 18th Impact

Deep: 18th Impact was an event held on February 12, 2005 in Tokyo.

Results

Deep: clubDeep Fukuoka: World Best Festival

Deep: clubDeep Fukuoka: World Best Festival was an event held on April 10, 2005 in Tokyo.

Results

Deep: Hero 1

Deep: Hero 1 was an event held on April 17, 2005 in Tokyo.

Results

Deep: clubDeep Toyama: Barbarian Festival 2

Deep: clubDeep Toyama: Barbarian Festival 2 was an event held on May 15, 2005 in Tokyo.

Results

Deep: 19th Impact

Deep: 19th Impact was an event held on July 8, 2005 in Tokyo.

Results

Deep: 20th Impact

Deep: 20th Impact was an event held on September 3, 2005 in Tokyo.

Results

Deep: 21st Impact

Deep: 21st Impact was an event held on October 28, 2005 in Tokyo.

Results

Deep: clubDeep Toyama: Barbarian Festival 3

Deep: clubDeep Toyama: Barbarian Festival 3 was an event held on October 30, 2005 in Tokyo.

Results

Deep: 22 Impact

Deep: 22 Impact was an event held on December 2, 2005 in Tokyo.

Results

Deep: Future King Tournament 2005

Deep: Future King Tournament 2005 was an event held on December 25, 2005 in Tokyo.

Results

See also 
 Deep
 List of Deep champions
 List of Deep events

References

Deep (mixed martial arts) events
2005 in mixed martial arts